The Selvikvågen Nature Reserve is located on Harøya island in the municipality of Ålesund in Møre og Romsdal county, Norway.

The area received protection in 1988 "to preserve an important wetland area with associated plant communities, bird life and other wildlife," according to the conservation regulations. Selvikvågen ('Selvik Bay') is a shallow bay with conservation-worthy beach meadows and narrow coves in the inner part, and with mudflats and large tidal areas; it is shielded from the sea by islets. The site is a grazing and nesting area for ducks and waders, and is also botanically rich, with 87 identified plant species, including curved sedge (Carex maritima), yellow flag (Iris pseudacorus), and water ragwort (Jacobaea aquatica).

The reserve is one of six natural areas that were included in the Harøya Wetlands System Ramsar site, which was established in 1996.

References

External links
 Mijlø-direktoratet: Selvikvågen. Map and description of the nature reserve.
 Miljøverndepartementet. 1987. Selvikvågen naturreservat, Sandøy kommune, Møre og Romsdal fylke. 1:5,000 map of the nature reserve.
 Forskrift om vern av Selvikvågen naturreservat, Sandøy kommune, Møre og Romsdal. 1988.

Nature reserves in Norway
Ramsar sites in Norway
Protected areas of Møre og Romsdal
Ålesund
Protected areas established in 1988